McDowell County Courthouse is a historic courthouse building located at Marion, McDowell County, North Carolina.  It was designed by architect Erle G. Stillwell and built between 1921 and 1923. It is three-story, late Neoclassical building sheathed in yellow brick.  The rectangular structure is composed of a central block flanked by slightly recessed, unornamented wings.

It was listed on the National Register of Historic Places in 1979. It is located in the Main Street Historic District.

References

External links

County courthouses in North Carolina
Courthouses on the National Register of Historic Places in North Carolina
Neoclassical architecture in North Carolina
Government buildings completed in 1923
Buildings and structures in McDowell County, North Carolina
National Register of Historic Places in McDowell County, North Carolina
Historic district contributing properties in North Carolina